Jesse Itzler is an American entrepreneur, author, and rapper.  He is the co-founder of Marquis Jet, one of the largest private jet card companies in the world, a partner in Zico Coconut Water, the founder of The 100 Mile Group and an owner of the NBA's Atlanta Hawks.

Early life and education
Jesse Itzler was born on August 22, 1968 to a Jewish family and raised in Roslyn, New York, on Long Island, the son of Daniel Itzler, an inventor, and Elese Itzler, the president of the Roslyn Board of Education. Itzler earned his bachelor's degree in 1990 from American University. He later obtained a degree in justice, law, and society.

Career

Music career
After graduating from college, Itzler signed with Delicious Vinyl records as a songwriter/artist.  He released his debut album Thirty Footer in Your Face using the pseudonym Jesse Jaymes in 1991. He co-wrote songs for various artists including Tone Lōc. His first released single "College Girls (Are Easy)" while not ranking on the Billboard Hot 100 chart did become a club anthem.  This was followed by his second single "Shake It Like A White Girl", which did reach 74 on the Billboard Hot 100 chart in 1991 and was featured in the soundtrack of the 2004 movie White Chicks. In 1992, Itzler wrote and sang the New York Knicks theme song "Go NY Go" as well as original songs for more than 50 other professional teams. Itzler wrote and sang the Emmy Award-winning song "I Love This Game" and also produced the theme song for Inside the NBA.  Itzler is credited with campaigns for Foot Locker and Coca-Cola.

Itzler's music partner was Dana Mozie, whom he met in 1987, a man described as being from a "strikingly different background... raised in the southeast section of Washington... as streetwise as Itzler was suburban," with whom he collaborated on several musical projects in his period as Jesse Jaymes.

Entrepreneurship
In 1996, Itzler co-founded Alphabet City Sports Records with his friend Kenny Dichter, the CEO of Wheels Up. The record company is known for mixing classic arena songs with highlights of historical play-by-play calls for professional sports teams including the Wizards, the Mavericks, and the Lakers. In 1998, the company was sold to SFX.

In 2001, Itzler co-founded Marquis Jet, one of the largest private jet card companies in the world. Itzler served as the company's Vice Chairman until the company was acquired by Berkshire Hathaway, parent company of NetJets, in 2009.

In 2009, Itzler created the 100 Mile Group, a brand incubator and accelerator.  The company announced a partnership with ZICO Coconut Water and the Coca-Cola company in 2009.  In 2012, ZICO was acquired by Coca-Cola for an undisclosed sum.

In November 2015, Itzler released his book Living With a SEAL: 31 Days Training With the Toughest Man on the Planet. The book was a New York Times Best Seller and ranked first on the LA Times book list. He released Living With the Monks: What Turning Off My Phone Taught Me about Happiness, Gratitude, and Focus in 2018. Itzler is represent by literary agent Lisa Leshne of The Leshne Agency. 

Recently, he has begun to pursue keynote speaking.

Atlanta Hawks
In 2015, Itzler and his wife, Sara Blakely were part of a group led by Tony Ressler along with Grant Hill, Steven Price, and Rick Schnall, that successfully purchased the Atlanta Hawks for $850 million from Bruce Levenson.

Personal life 
In 2006, Itzler competed in the USA National Ultra Marathon Championship in Grapevine, Texas, successfully completing a 100-mile run in under 24 hours. Itzler finished 49th out of 80 in the SEA Paddle NYC 25 mile stand up paddle race around Manhattan in 2012.

In 2008, Itzler married Sara Blakely, the founder of Spanx, at the Gasparilla Inn and Club in Boca Grande, Florida. The couple have four children and reside in Georgia.

References

External links 
[ Thirty Footer in Your Face] on Allmusic
 Jesse's video interview with Crains New York Business in 2008

Living people
Rappers from New York (state)
1968 births
American University alumni
20th-century American Jews
People from Roslyn, New York
American sports owners
Jewish rappers
20th-century American singers
21st-century American rappers
21st-century American Jews